Lisa Kay Stark (born March 15, 1959) is an American judge, serving on the Wisconsin Court of Appeals since 2013.  She has been Deputy Chief Judge of the Court of Appeals since 2015.  Prior to the Court of Appeals, she was a Wisconsin Circuit Court Judge for 15 years in Eau Claire County.

Biography

Born in Appleton, Wisconsin, Stark graduated from Lincoln High School in Manitowoc, Wisconsin.  She received her B.A. from the University of Wisconsin–Eau Claire and her J.D. degree from the University of Wisconsin Law School.  She was admitted to the State Bar of Wisconsin in 1982 and practiced law as a partner in the firm Misfeldt, Stark, Richie, Wickstrom & Wachs.  She was Chair of the Eau Claire Area Chamber of Commerce in 1999, and was on the board of directors of the London Square Bank from 1995 to 2000.

In 2000, Stark was elected a Wisconsin Circuit Court judge for Eau Claire County, Wisconsin.  She was subsequently re-elected in 2006 and 2012.  As a circuit court judge, she was presiding judge of the Eau Claire County Drug Court and president of the Eau Claire County Restorative Justice Program.  She was appointed Associate Dean of the Wisconsin Judicial College for two three-year terms in 2005 and 2008, and was appointed Dean in 2010 by Chief Justice Shirley Abrahamson.

In November 2012, Judge Gregory A. Peterson announced his plan to retire, creating a vacancy on the Wisconsin Court of Appeals.  Judge Stark chose to run for the seat and was unopposed in the 2013 election.  Since the seat was already vacated, Governor Scott Walker appointed her to begin the term early—she took office April 23, 2013.  From August 2, 2015, Stark has served as presiding judge of the court's Wausau-based District III and as the court's deputy chief judge, serving with Chief Judge Lisa Neubauer.  She was re-elected in 2019 without opposition.

Electoral history

Wisconsin Circuit Court (2000, 2006, 2012)

| colspan="6" style="text-align:center;background-color: #e9e9e9;"| Primary Election, February 15, 2000

| colspan="6" style="text-align:center;background-color: #e9e9e9;"| General Election, April 4, 2000

Wisconsin Court of Appeals (2013, 2019)

| colspan="6" style="text-align:center;background-color: #e9e9e9;"| General Election, April 2, 2013

| colspan="6" style="text-align:center;background-color: #e9e9e9;"| General Election, April 2, 2019

References

External links
 Lisa Stark on Ballotpedia

1959 births
Living people
Politicians from Appleton, Wisconsin
University of Wisconsin–Eau Claire alumni
University of Wisconsin Law School alumni
Wisconsin state court judges
Wisconsin Court of Appeals judges
21st-century American judges
21st-century American women judges